The Atlantic spadefish (Chaetodipterus faber) is a species of marine fish belonging to the family Ephippidae. It is the symbol of the North Carolina Aquariums.

Taxonomy and etymology 
The scientific name is derived from the Greek word "chaíti" meaning "mane" and "dipteros" meaning "with two fins." The Atlantic spadefish belongs to the genus Chaetodipterus, which includes two other species: the West African spadefish (Chaetodipterus lippei) and the Pacific spadefish (Chaetodipterus zonatus). The genus Chaetodipterus belongs to the family Ephippidae, which includes spadefish and batfish.

Chaetodipterus faber is known by numerous other colloquial names, including angelfish, white angelfish, threetailed porgy, ocean cobbler, and moonfish.

Description 

The disk-shaped body is very deep and compressed, and the snout is blunt. There are 9 dorsal spines and 21-24 soft dorsal rays, and there are 3 anal spines and 17-19 anal rays. The second dorsal and anal fins of adults have long, trailing anterior lobes, giving an "angelfish-like" appearance. The body is silver in color with irregular black vertical bands that fade gradually with age. There are 4-6 black vertical bands on each side, with the first running through the eye and the last running through the caudal peduncle.

The mouth is small, with the maxilla of adults ending beneath the nostrils. The teeth are small and brushlike, and there are no teeth on the roof of the mouth. The head and fins are covered with ctenoid scales.

Diet 

Atlantic spadefish feed on small, benthic invertebrates including crustaceans, mollusks, annelids, and cnidarians. They also feed on plankton in the water column.

Distribution and habitat 
The species is endemic to the western Atlantic Ocean. They are found off the coast of the southeastern United States as far north as Massachusetts, the Gulf of Mexico, and in the Caribbean. They are also found in Bermuda and the eastern coast of Brazil.

The fish inhabits marine and brackish waters typically in subtropical climates. Juveniles commonly inhabit estuaries until maturity and adults prefer mangroves, beaches, and harbors.

Reproduction and life cycle 
Spawning season occurs from May to September. A female can release up to one million eggs per season. The eggs hatch after 24 hours and the larvae feed on a yolk for two days before actively feeding.

Importance to humans 
Atlantic spadefish are not of much commercial value. Due to their reputation as strong fighters, they are popular game fish, especially during the summer months when they are most active. The Atlantic spadefish has become a popular target species for sportfishermen due to their abundance and the strong fight they have for their size. They are good table fare, especially if smoked or grilled. A common method of catching involves using small pieces of clam on a small circle hook.

See also 
 Ephippidae 
 Pacific spadefish
 Chaetodipterus
 Angelfish (disambiguation)
 Recreational fishing

References

External links 
 Photos of Chaetodipterus faber in iNaturalist

Atlantic spadefish
Sport fish
Fish of the Caribbean
Fish of Brazil
Fish of the Atlantic Ocean
Atlantic spadefish
Fish of Cuba
Fish of the Dominican Republic
Taxa named by Pierre Marie Auguste Broussonet